The 1931 South Dakota State Jackrabbits football team was an American football team that represented South Dakota State University in the North Central Conference (NCC) during the 1931 college football season. In its fourth season under head coach Cy Kasper, the team compiled a 6–3 record and outscored opponents by a total of 194 to 78.

Schedule

References

South Dakota State
South Dakota State Jackrabbits football seasons
South Dakota State Jackrabbits football